HMS Truant was an  destroyer, which served with the Royal Navy. The vessel was the first of the name to enter service in the navy. However, in 1921, the destroyer became the control ship for the radio-controlled target ship  and, in 1923, a similar role with smaller Coastal Motor Boats. This service did not last long. The signing of the London Naval Treaty sounded the death knell for the ship as it limited the destroyer tonnage that the Royal Navy could operate. As newer and more powerful destroyers entered service, Truant was retired on 28 November 1931 and broken up.

Design and development

Truant was one of thirty-three Admiralty  destroyers ordered by the British Admiralty in June 1917 as part of the Twelfth War Construction Programme. Differences with the R class were minor, such as having the searchlight moved aft.

Armament consisted of three QF  Mk IV guns on the ship's centreline.  One was mounted raised on the forecastle, one between the funnels and one aft. The ship also mounted a single  2-pounder pom-pom anti-aircraft gun for air defence. Four  tubes were fitted in two twin rotating mounts aft. The ship was also equipped with two  torpedo tubes either side of the superstructure which were fired by the commanding officer using toggle ropes. The ship had a complement of 90 officers and ratings.

Construction and career
Truant was laid down by J. Samuel White at East Cowes on the Isle of Wight with the yard number 1513 on 14 February 1918, and launched on 18 September the same year. The ship was completed on 17 March the following year. The vessel was the first to carry the name. The ship was given a reduced complement on 13 May 1919. 

In August 1921, Truant was converted to be the control ship for the radio-controlled target ship . In 1923, Truant served in the additional role of Signals School trials ship as well as working with smaller radio-controlled Coastal Motor Boats. However, this role did not last long, the destroyer being replaced as controller by sister ship  within a few years. On 22 April 1930, the United Kingdom signed the London Naval Treaty, which limited the total destroyer tonnage that the navy could operate. As newer, larger and more powerful vessels were introduced, older destroyers like the S class were gradually retired. Truant remained in service until 28 November 1931 when the vessel was sold to Rees of Llanelly, and broken up.

Pennant numbers

References

Citations

Bibliography

 
 
 
 
 
 
 
 
 
 
 

1918 ships
S-class destroyers (1917) of the Royal Navy
Ships built on the Isle of Wight